Bellator 277: McKee vs. Pitbull 2 was a mixed martial arts event produced by Bellator MMA that took place on April 15, 2022, at the SAP Center in San Jose, California, United States.

Background 
The event was headlined by a rematch between Bellator Featherweight Champion A. J. McKee and Patrício Pitbull. The duo previously fought in the Bellator 263 main event, where McKee took Pitbull's title in the Bellator Featherweight World Grand Prix final via a first-round guillotine choke submission.

The co-main event featured the final of the Bellator Light Heavyweight World Grand Prix Tournament as Bellator Light Heavyweight champion Vadim Nemkov and The Ultimate Fighter: Team Edgar vs. Team Penn light heavyweight winner Corey Anderson for the Bellator Light Heavyweight World Championship as well as the $1 million prize. Nemkov, on the way to the final, defeated Phil Davis via a unanimous decision and secured a fourth-round kimura stoppage against Julius Anglickas. On the other side of the bracket, Anderson defeated both Dovletdzhan Yagshimuradov and Ryan Bader by TKO.

A heavyweight bout between former interim Bellator Heavyweight World Championship challenger Timothy Johnson and Tyrell Fortune was scheduled for the event. However, on March 1, 2022, it was announced by Bellator that Johnson was expected to face Linton Vassell and Fortune was set to meet Steve Mowry in the event. In turn, Mowry pulled out of the bout in late March and was replaced by Rakim Cleveland.

A middleweight bout between Pat Downey and Daniel Compton was scheduled for this event. However, after developing Red skin syndrome, Downey was forced to pull out of the bout.

A light heavyweight bout between Dovletdzhan Yagshimuradov and Tony Johnson was scheduled for the event. However, due to an injury, Johnson was forced to pull out and was replaced by former Bellator Middleweight Champion Rafael Carvalho.

A featherweight bout between Aaron Pico and Jeremy Kennedy was expected to take place at the event. However, Kennedy withdrew 8 days before the event and Adli Edwards replaced him.

Results

Aftermath
After the Grand Prix Final ended in a no contest and no winner was declared, Bellator frontman Scott Coker announced that the final between Nemkov and Anderson will be rebooked later in 2022.

Reported payout
The following is the reported payout to the fighters as reported to the California State Athletic Commission. It is important to note the amounts do not include sponsor money, discretionary bonuses, viewership points or additional earnings.
Patrício Freire: $250,000 def. A.J. McKee: $250,000
Vadim Nemkov: $80,000 vs. Corey Anderson: $250,000
Aaron Pico: $75,000 def. Adli Edwards: $50,000
Linton Vassell: $138,000 (includes $69,000 win bonus) def. Timothy Johnson: $75,000
Tyrell Fortune: $75,000 def. Rakim Cleveland: $30,000
Tyson Miller: $4,000 (includes $2,000 win bonus) def. Rhalen Gracie: $5,000
Dovletdzhan Yagshimuradov: $70,000 (includes $35,000 win bonus) def. Rafael Carvalho: $30,000
Gaston Bolanos: $50,000 (includes $25,000 win bonus) def. Daniel Carey: $12,000
Bobby Seronio III: $4,000 (includes $2,000 win bonus) def. Calob Ramirez: $2,000
Kyle Crutchmer: $50,000 (includes $25,000 win bonus) def. Michael Lombardo: $20,000
Edwin De Los Santos: $4,000 (includes $2,000 win bonus) def. Alberto Mendez: $2,000
Rogelio Luna: $4,000 (includes $2,000 win bonus) def. Socrates Hernandez: $2,000
Laird Anderson: $4,000 (includes $2,000 win bonus) def. JT Donaldson: $2,000
Theo Haig: $4,000 (includes $2,000 win bonus) def. Alan Benson: $2,000

See also 

 2022 in Bellator MMA
 List of Bellator MMA events
 List of current Bellator fighters
 Bellator MMA Rankings

References 

Events in San Jose, California
Bellator MMA events
2022 in mixed martial arts
April 2022 sports events in the United States
2022 in sports in California
Mixed martial arts in California
Sports competitions in California